The RA series of 3.5-litre and 3.0-litre, naturally-aspirated, V10 racing engines were made by Honda to compete in Formula One racing; between  and , and then again between  and . Between 1992 and 2000, the engines were also made by Mugen Honda. The customer engines were used by McLaren, Arrows, Lotus, Ligier, Tyrrell, Prost, and Jordan.

Background
1989 was the first year where naturally aspirated engines were compulsory for all teams after the banning of the turbocharged units at the end of the previous season. To this end, Honda built a 3.5-litre V10 engine, developed throughout most of the latter half of 1987 and through 1988.

The engine for 1990 was tweaked and Senna did much development work to ensure he would have better reliability in the new season. He and Gerhard Berger took the fight to Prost and Ferrari in 1990, winning another six races and winning the Constructors' Championship.

Although Honda withdrew from the sport at the end of 1992 season, Mugen remained affiliated with Footwork in 1993 and created a B version of the MF351H, used by Aguri Suzuki and Derek Warwick.

At the end of the year, Mugen switched to Team Lotus with plans for a new Lotus 109. The team - with drivers Johnny Herbert and Pedro Lamy (later replaced by Alessandro Zanardi) - was underfunded and the 109 chassis was late arriving. The Mugen engine, codenamed MF351HC (also known as ZA5C), was not able to show its full potential and failed to score a single World Championship point during 1994 despite coming close on 3 occasions. This was the only season in which Mugen engines (and Lotus) did not score a World Championship point during their time in Formula One.

After Lotus closed at the end of the year, Mugen switched to the Ligier team, which was then being run for Flavio Briatore by Tom Walkinshaw, with drivers Olivier Panis, Martin Brundle and Aguri Suzuki, although it was initially planned for the Minardi team. The 3.0 L engine, conforming to the new regulations, was codenamed MF301H. The 1995 season was promising with points being scored at nine races and the team securing two podiums, one courtesy of Brundle finishing third at the Belgian Grand Prix and the other by Panis finishing second at the Australian Grand Prix. The team secured 24 points and finished a respectable 5th in the Constructors Championship. The following season with Ligier resulted in Mugen's first Formula One victory as well as Ligier's last Formula One victory at the 1996 Monaco Grand Prix with Panis at the wheel. Despite this unexpected success, the Mugen powered Ligier car only scored three more points finishes during the rest of the season two 6th-place finishes from Diniz and one 5th-place finish from Panis; the team suffered 17 retirements during 1996.

Ligier was taken over by Alain Prost in 1997, and the newly named Prost Grand Prix ran MF301HB engines with Jarno Trulli leading the Austrian Grand Prix before suffering an engine failure. The Prost team managed two podium finishes during the 1997 season at Brazil and Spain, scoring points in 8 races over the season securing a final total of 21 points and a 6th-place finish in the Constructors Championship.

With Prost establishing a relationship with Peugeot and switching to them from 1998 onwards, Mugen looked for a new partner and reached a two-year agreement with Jordan Grand Prix for which Mugen produced the MF301HC engine. The first half of the 1998 season was an absolute disaster; it was so bad that at one point Mugen officials met with Eddie Jordan and his team during the 1998 Monaco Grand Prix to find out why up until then the team had failed to score a single World Championship point. The relationship continued at Silverstone where the team scored their first World Championship point of the season courtesy of a 6th-place finish from Ralf Schumacher, followed by points finishes at the next 3 races. It was not until Spa-Francorchamps, when Jordan's fortunes changed for the better with drivers Damon Hill and Ralf Schumacher scored a 1-2 finish securing Jordan's first ever Formula One victory and their only 1-2 finish during their existence after a crash-marred start. The team would score points on two further occasions with Ralf achieving a 3rd-place finish at the Italian Grand Prix. Gary Anderson would later reveal that, by that season, Honda's headquarters had increased their involvement in developing the engines that otherwise still carry Mugen branding.

The 1999 season resulted in further success with Heinz-Harald Frentzen winning twice in France and Italy and even challenging for the title, although he failed in doing so due to better performance from McLaren and Ferrari. Mugen-built engines were also used for the RC101B/RC-F1 2.0X, a car built by the Honda R&D Center without direct support from Honda headquarters (previous cars built by the R&D Center used older Honda engines when they supplied engines for McLaren) and for the Honda RA099, an official Honda test car to prepare for Honda's factory engine supply operation.

Honda returned as an engine supplier in 2000, as the sole engine supplier for British American Racing. They debuted with the 3.0-litre RA000E, in a partnership that would last six years, until they were bought out by Honda in 2006.

Applications

McLaren MP4/5
McLaren MP4/5B
Tyrrell 020
BAR 002
BAR 003
BAR 004
BAR 005
BAR 006
BAR 007
Jordan 198
Jordan 199
Jordan EJ10
Jordan EJ11
Jordan EJ12
Footwork FA13
Footwork FA14
Ligier JS41
Ligier JS43
Prost JS45
Lotus 107C
Lotus 109

Grand Prix engine results
2 World Constructors' Championships.
2 World Drivers' Championships.
20 race wins.
30 pole positions.
66 podium finishes.

References

RA
Formula One engines
Gasoline engines by model
V10 engines